Abdulla Hamad Mohammed Salmeen Al-Menhali (Arabic:عبد الله حمد محمد سليم المنهالي) (born 18 September 2001) is an Emirati footballer. He currently plays as a midfielder for Al-Wahda.

Career
Abdulla Hamad started his career at Al-Wahda and is a product of the Al-Wahda's youth system. On 18 October 2019, It has been suspended 4 matches due to his absence from U20 UAE camp without prior excuse . On 16 December 2019, Abdulla Hamad made his professional debut for Al-Wahda against Khor Fakkan in the Pro League, replacing Yahya Al Ghassani .

References

External links
 

2001 births
Living people
Emirati footballers
Al Wahda FC players
UAE Pro League players
Association football midfielders
Place of birth missing (living people)